Philomycidae are a family of air-breathing land slugs (snails without shells or with only shell remnants). They are terrestrial pulmonate gastropod mollusks in the superfamily Arionoidea (according to the taxonomy of the Gastropoda by Bouchet & Rocroi, 2005).

The family Philomycidae has no subfamilies.

Distribution
Slugs in this family are found in China, Japan, the East Indies, central and eastern North America, and through Central America into northern South America.

Anatomy
Members of this family most obviously differ from related slugs in that their mantles are broadly rounded, and very large, covering the entire body. (In mollusks, the mantle consists of the tissues that normally generate the shell. Being mostly or entirely without shells, most slugs have reduced mantles.)

Pilsbry (1948) stated that "the enormously developed mantle, the large empty shell sac, and the insertions of the free retractor muscles along the margins of the foot cavity, instead of dorsally as in the Arionidae are special to the Philomycidae".

A further anatomical oddity of the group, shared with certain helicid and zonitid snails, is their creation and use of calcareous love darts during mating.

In this family, the number of haploid chromosomes lies between 21 and 30 (according to the values in this table).

Genera
Genera within the family Philomycidae include:
 Megapallifera Hubricht, 1956
 Meghimatium Hasselt, 1823 - synonym: Incilaria Benson, 1842
 Pallifera Morse, 1864
 Philomycus Rafinesque, 1820 - the type genus

Cladogram 
A cladogram based on sequences of cytochrome-c oxidase I (COI) genes showing phylogenic relations of genera in the family Philomycidae by Tsai & Wu (2008) (simplified):

Arion and Deroceras were used as outgroup.

References

External links 

Slugs of Florida on the UF / IFAS Featured Creatures Web site

 
Taxa named by John Edward Gray
Gastropod families